Cyclamen cilicium is a species of flowering perennial plant in the family Primulaceae. It is native to coniferous woodland at  elevation in the Taurus Mountains of southern Turkey.

Etymology
The species name cilicium is the adjective of Cilicia, an ancient name of a region of southeast Turkey.

Description

The leaves are heart-shaped or oval and green, often patterned with silver. The flowers bloom in autumn (fall) and have 5 sepals and 5 upswept petals, white to rose-pink with magenta markings on the nose. They are fragrant.

Like many hardy cyclamens, it requires sharp drainage and a hot, dry summer. If this cannot be provided, a controlled environment under glass may be preferable. This plant has gained the Royal Horticultural Society's Award of Garden Merit (confirmed 2017).

Forms
Cyclamen cilicium forma album has pure-white petals.

Cyclamen intaminatum was formerly known as Cyclamen cilicium var. intaminatum.

References

External links

Cyclamen Society
Gallery of the World's Bulbs — International Bulb Society

IPNI Listing
Kew Plant List

cilicium
Taxa named by Pierre Edmond Boissier
Taxa named by Theodor von Heldreich